Scotland competed at the 2011 Commonwealth Youth Games in Isle of Man from 7 to 13 September 2011.The Commonwealth Games Scotland selected 50 competitors. Scotland won five gold medals, six silver and eleven bronze medals. 3 of their gold medals were won by swimmer Craig Benson who took a clean sweep of Breastroke titles. They finished in the sixth place overall.

References

Nations at the 2011 Commonwealth Youth Games
2011 in Scottish sport